James Forman (1928–2005) was an African-American leader in the civil rights movement.

James Forman may also refer to:
 James Forman Jr. (born 1967), American legal scholar
 James Henry Forman (1896–1972), World War I Canadian flying ace
 James Mtume (James Forman, born 1947), American musician

See also
 James Foreman (disambiguation)